Konstantin Vsevolodovich (18 May 1186 in Rostov – 2 February 1218) was the eldest son of Vsevolod the Big Nest and Maria Shvarnovna.

In 1206 and 1207, he was the prince of Novgorod. In 1207, his father sent him to rule the towns of Rostov and Yaroslavl. In consequence of one domestic squabble, Vsevolod disinherited Konstantin on his deathbed and bequeathed his capital Vladimir to a younger son, Yuri II. In the Battle of Lipitsa (1216), Konstantin and his ally Mstislav of Novgorod soundly defeated Yuri and occupied Vladimir.

Upon Konstantin's death in 1218, Yuri returned to the throne. Konstantin's descendants, meanwhile, retained the towns of Rostov and Yaroslavl, where they would reign until the late 15th century. Thus, numerous princely families of Russia issue from this prince. Konstantin is also remembered for building the new Assumption Cathedral in Rostov and three brick cathedrals in Yaroslavl.

Further reading
 Bibliography of the history of the Early Slavs and Rus'
 Bibliography of Russian history (1223–1613)
 List of Slavic studies journals

1186 births
1218 deaths
People from Rostov
Grand Princes of Vladimir
Rurik dynasty
Yurievichi family
13th-century princes in Kievan Rus'
Eastern Orthodox monarchs
Grand Princes of Kiev